Davoud Amirian is an Iranian contemporary writer. He has published more than 26 books and won several awards. He is currently working on write memoirs, children's and adolescent literature, novels, comics, biographies of martyrs and screenwriting.

Life
He was born in 1970 in Kerman, Kerman Province, Iran. Davoud Amirian began his writing career in 1990 by writing his memoirs about the Iran-Iraq War. Some people consider him one of the top five writers on Iran-Iraq War and introduce him as the first generation of writers on Iran-Iraq War subject.

Bibliography
The books "Farzandane Iranim (title means We are Children of Iran)", "Refaghat beh Sabke Tank (title means Friendship in the style of a tank)" and "Doostan Khodahafezi Nemikonand (title means Friends do not say goodbye)", "Dastane Behnam (title means The Story of Behnam)", "Dastane Maryam (title means The Story of Maryam)", "Tavllode Yek Parvaneh (title means Birth of a Butterfly)" and "Jame Jahani dar Javadieh (title means World Cup in Javadiyeh)" are some of his most famous fiction works. Some of these books won the Iran's Book of the Year Awards, Holy Defense Year Book Award, Award of Institute for the Intellectual Development of Children and Young Adults and dozens of other awards.

 Khodahafez Karkheh (title means Goodbye Karkheh), his first work, 1990
 Farmandeye Man (title means My commander), 1990
 Behesht Baraye Tow (title means Heaven for you), 1991
 Iraj Khasteh Ast (title means Iraj is tired), 1994
 Mine Nokhodi (title means The little Mine), 1996
 Akharin Savare Sarnevesht (title means The last rider of destiny), 1997
 Farzandane Iranim (title means We are Children of Iran), 1999
 Aghaye Shahrdar (title means Mr. Mayor), 2000
 Dastane Behnam (title means The Story of Behnam), Biography of Behnam Mohammadi, 2002
 Tavllode Yek Parvaneh (title means Birth of a Butterfly), 2002
 Doostan Khodahafezi Nemikonand (title means Friends do not say goodbye), 2003
 Matarsake Mazraeye Atashin (title means Fire Farm Scarecrow), 2003
 Refaghat beh Sabke Tank (title means Friendship in the style of a tank), 2003
 Marde Bahari (title means The Spring man), 2003
 Lahzeye Jodayi Man (title means The moment of my separation), 2003
 Jame Jahani dar Javadieh (title means World Cup in Javadiyeh), 2004
 Dow Salahshouro Nesfi (title means Two warriors and half), 2004
 Leyli (title means Lily), 2005
 Pesarane Nime Shab (title means Midnight Boys), 2006
 Sarbaze Kouchake Eslam (title means Little Soldier of Islam), 2007
 Akharin Golouleye Sayad (title means The Last Bullet of Sayad), Biography of Ali Sayad Shirazi, 2007
 Dastane Maryam (title means The Story of Maryam), biography of Maryam Farhanian, 2007
 Vaghti Aghajan Dastgir Shod (title means When Aghajan was arrested), 2008
 Hoveyzeh (title means The curb), 2008
 Akharin Negah (title means Last look), 2008
 Mardha Ham Geryeh Mikonand (title means Men cry too), 2008
 Yek Nafas Ta Bahar (title means One breath until spring), 2009
 Balouch Geryeh Nemikonad (title means Balouch does not cry), 2010
 Behesht Montazer Mimanad (title means Heaven is waiting), 2010
 Gordane Ghaterchiha (title means The Skinners Battalion), 2011
 Shahid Behnam Mohammadi (title means Martyr Behnam Mohammadi), 2012
 Khomparehaye Fased (title means Corrupt mortars), 2013
 Halazoune Man Gomshode (title means My snail is missing), 2014
 Farare Shahaneh (title means Royal Escape), 2015
 Yarane Aftab (title means Friends of the sun), 2015
 Koodakestane Agha Morsel (title means Mr. Morsel Kindergarten), 2016
 Dar Masafe Gorgha (title means In the fight against wolves), 2016
 Mehrabantarin Aghaye Donya (title means The kindest gentleman in the world), 2016
 Hemaseh Aghaz Mishavad (title means The epic begins), 2016
 Shekarchie Shir (title means The lion hunter), 2016
 Sarbedar (title means Head to gallows), 2017
 Baradare Man Toyi (title means You are my brother), 2018
 Tarkeshe Velgar (title means The stray quiver), 2018
 Mard (title means The man), 2018
 Shahri Por az Mehrbani va Mobarezeh (title means A city full of kindness and struggle), 2018
 Moghabeleh ba Peymane Shoom (title means Confront with the ominous pact), 2018
 Mehmanie Baghe Sib (title means Apple Garden Party), 2019
 Jostojougarane Shamshire Edalat (title means Seekers of the Sword of Justice), 2019
 Payegahe Serri (title means Secret base), 2019

Screenplays
Some of Davoud Amirian's works have been used as screenplays in Iranian cinema and television. Most famous movies among his works that have been produced and screened are Akharin Nabard (film title means The Last Battle) directed by Hamid Bahmani, Behesht Montazer Mimanad (film title means Heaven is waiting) directed by Mohammad Reza Ahanj and Nofouzi (film title means The informer) directed by Ahmad Kaveri and Mehdi Fayouzi.

 Akharin Nabard (film title means The Last Battle) directed by Hamid Bahmani, 1997
 Nofouzi (film title means informer) directed by Ahmad Kaveri and Mehdi Fayouzi, 2008
 Galougahe Sheytan (film title means Devil's Throat) directed by Hamid Bahmani, 2010
 Behesht Montazer Mimanad (film title means Heaven is waiting) directed by Mohammad Reza Ahanj, 2011

See also
 Majid Gheisari
 Tahereh Saffarzadeh
 Seyyed Mahdi Shojaee
 Ahad Gudarziani
 Masoumeh Abad
 Ahmad Dehqan
 Akbar Sahraee
 Holy Defense Year Book Award

References

External links
 Davoud Amirian on Goodreads
 A TV series will be created from Amirian' book Doostan Khodahafezi Nemikonand (title means Friends do not say goodbye)

1970 births
Living people
Iranian male writers
People from Kerman
Persian-language writers
Recipients of the Holy Defense Year Book Award
Iranian people of the Iran–Iraq War
Iranian children's writers
People from Kerman Province
Iran's Book of the Year Awards recipients